The Italy national alpine ski team represents Italy in international alpine skiing competitions such as Winter Olympic Games, FIS Alpine Ski World Cup and FIS Alpine World Ski Championships.

World Cup
Italian alpine skiers won seven overall FIS Alpine Ski World Cup, six men and one women.

Titles

Men

Women

Race winner

Men

 Updated to 5 February 2021

NA - Disciplines didn't exist yet

Women
 
 Updated to 17 January 2023

NA - Disciplines didn't exist yet

Podiums
Updated to 31 January 2023, individual podium Italian skiers, and podiums per nations.

Men

Women

Team
Total uplaoded at the end of the World Cup 2022. Team podiums (0, 1, 1) are excluded.

Closed in the top ten in overall
The Italian alpine skiers finished 56 times men (15 times on podium) and 32 times women (4 times on podium), on top ten in overall  at the FIS Alpine Ski World Cup.

Men

Women

Closed in the podium on discipline standings (Men)

Men's slalom

Men's giant slalom

Men's downhill

Men's Super-G

Men's combined

Closed in the podium on discipline standings (Women)

Women's slalom

Women's giant slalom

Women's downhill

Women's Super-G

Women's combined

Women's parallel

World championships

From 1948 to 1980 (9 times) the Olympic titles was also world titles. Updated to Cortina 2021 (only individual events).
 

The 1941 World Championships results cancelled by the FIS in 1946 due to the limited number of participants during wartime. Italy had won the following seven medals.

Olympic Games
From 1948 to 1980 (9 times) the Olympic titles was also World titles.
Updated to 6 March 2022.

See also
Italy at the Winter Olympics
Italy at the FIS Alpine World Ski Championships
Italian Winter Sports Federation

References

External links
Italian Winter Sports Federation
La storia della FISI at Italian National Olympic Committee 

 
Italy